Lacuna mediterranea is a species of sea snail, a marine gastropod mollusk in the family Eulimidae. This species is one of two known species to exist within the genus, Ersilia, the other species is Ersilia stancyki. As the name suggests, this species is mainly distributed throughout European waters off the coasts of the Iberian Peninsula.

Description
The shell measures approximately 2 mm in length.

Distribution
This species occurs in the following locations:

 European waters (ERMS scope)
 Portuguese Exclusive Economic Zone
 Spanish Exclusive Economic Zone

References

External links
 To World Register of Marine Species

Eulimidae
Gastropods described in 1869